The Spacecraft Tracking and Data (Acquisition) Network (STADAN or STDN) was established by NASA in the early 1960s to satisfy the requirement for long-duration, highly available space-to-ground communications.  The network was the “follow-on” to the earlier Minitrack, which tracked the flights of Sputnik, Vanguard, Explorer, and other early space efforts (1957–1962).  Real-time operational control and scheduling of the network was provided by the Network Operations Control Center (NOCC) at the Goddard Space Flight Center (GSFC) in
Greenbelt, Maryland.

Consisting of parabolic dish antennas and telephone switching equipment deployed around the world, the STADAN provided space-to-ground communications for approximately 15 minutes of a 90-minute orbit period. This limited contact period sufficed for uncrewed spacecraft, but crewed spacecraft require a much higher data collection time.  In May 1971 STADAN was consolidated with the Manned Space Flight Network (MSFN) to form the Spaceflight Tracking and Data Network (STDN).

Stations

STADAN stations were located:
 Goddard Space Flight Center in Greenbelt, Maryland, US (ETC) - Network Operations Control Center 
 Orroral Valley Tracking Station in Canberra, Australia (ORR)
 Carnarvon, Australia (CRO)
 Cooby Creek Tracking Station in Toowoomba, Queensland, Australia
 Johannesburg, South Africa (BUR)
 Tananarive, Madagascar (TAN)
 East Grand Forks, Minnesota, US
 Shoe Cove, Newfoundland and Labrador, Canada (NFL) 
 Fort Myers, Florida, US
 Quito, Ecuador (QUI)
 Lima, Peru
 Santiago, Chile (AGO)
 Antofagasta, Chile
 Fairbanks, Alaska, US (ULA)
 Winkfield, England (WNK)
 Rosman, North Carolina, US (ROS)
 Goldstone Deep Space Communications Complex in Goldstone, California, US (GDS)
 Barstow, California, US
 Brown Field, California near Chula Vista, US
 Pakistan
 Crete, Greece
 Ascension Island, (South Atlantic Ocean)
 Cooper's Island, Bermuda (BDA)

Later developments
Most of the STADAN stations were phased out in the early 1980s, as the Tracking and Data Relay Satellite System (TDRS), took over most of the work of tracking satellites in low Earth orbit.  Another network, the Deep Space Network (DSN), interacted with crewed craft higher than 10,000 miles from Earth, such as the Apollo missions, in addition to its primary mission of data collection from deep space probes.

See also
NASCOM

External links
 "STDN User's Manual" - Goddard Space Flight Center, (NASA-TM-X-72932) STDN User's Manual N75-78163, Baseline Document (NASA) 124 pages, UNCLAS 00/98 03939
 GSFC X-202067-26 William R. Corliss (1967). Evolution of the Satellite Tracking And Data Acquisition Network (STADAN). 
 NASA CR-140390 - William R. Corliss (June 1974). Histories of the Space Tracking and Data Acquisition Network (STADAN), the Manned Space Flight Network (MSFN), and the NASA Communications Network (NASCOM).
 NASA SP-2007-4233 - Sunny Tsiao (2007). "Read You Loud and Clear!" The Story of NASA's Spaceflight Tracking and Data Network.
 Network stations list
 STADAN Station in Shoe Cove, Newfoundland
 "NASA Directory of Observation Station Locations" - Goddard Space Flight Center, (NASA-TM-X-69902) NASA Directory of Observation Station Locations, 274 pages

Notes

Goddard Space Flight Center
NASA radio communications and spacecraft tracking facilities